Mohammad Khair Abdel-Razzaq Saeed Al-Jamal is a retired Jordanian footballer  who played for the Jordan national football team.

Honors and Participation in International Tournaments

In WAFF Championships 
2014 WAFF Championship

References
Khair: "I Terminated My Contract With Shabab Al-Ordon Because of Alaa' Nabeel... And My Eyes on Taking Proficiency Outside of Jordan" 
Mohammad Khair Included in Fahaheel (KUW)  
Khair: "I Have Signed Up for Fahaheel (KUW) and Hope to Be Successful On My First Experience in Taking Proficiency Outside of Jordan"
Al-Yarmouk (JOR) Include Mohammad Khair and Salu 
Khair Officially Transfers to Al-Ramtha SC

External links

1986 births
Living people
Jordanian footballers
Jordan international footballers
Jordan youth international footballers
Association football midfielders
Footballers at the 2006 Asian Games
Sportspeople from Amman
Jordanian expatriate footballers
Jordanian expatriate sportspeople in Kuwait
Expatriate footballers in Kuwait
Asian Games competitors for Jordan
Kufrsoum SC players
Al-Shabab SC (Kuwait) players
Kuwait Premier League players
Al-Fahaheel FC players
Al-Yarmouk FC (Jordan) players
That Ras Club players
Al-Ramtha SC players
Shabab Al-Ordon Club players
Shabab Al-Hussein SC players
Al-Faisaly SC players
Jordanian Pro League players
Ittihad Al-Ramtha players